Karl Paul Immanuel von Hase (24 July 1885 – 8 August 1944) was a German career soldier and figured among the members of the resistance against Adolf Hitler's Nazi regime.

Biography
Hase was born in Hanover. He was the fifth child of Paul and Frieda von Hase.  On 12 December 1921, Hase married Margarete, Baronesse von Funck in Neustrelitz.  They had four children:  Ina, Maria-Gisela, Alexander and Friedrich-Wilhelm.

He held the following posts in the Reichswehr/Wehrmacht during the time of the Third Reich:
 1933–1934 Battalion commander in Neuruppin;
 1934–1935 Battalion commander in Landsberg an der Warthe;
 1935–1938 Commander 50th Regiment;
 1939–1940 Commander 46th Division;
 1940 Commander 56th Division;
 1940–1944 City commandant of Berlin.

From 1938, Brigadier-General von Hase was privy to the conspiracy plans plotted by such men as Wilhelm Canaris, Hans Oster, Generals Erwin von Witzleben, Franz Halder and Erich Hoepner. He was an uncle of Dietrich Bonhoeffer, the famous Lutheran pastor who also took part in the conspiracy.

On 20 July 1944, after the failed assassination of Hitler at the Wolf's Lair in East Prussia, Hase ordered Major Otto Ernst Remer of the Infantry Regiment Großdeutschland to seal off the government quarter in Berlin during the subsequent coup d'état attempt. Remer later removed the cordon and Hase was arrested by the Gestapo that evening whilst he was dining with Joseph Goebbels.

In the trial against him and a number of other members of the plot at the Volksgerichtshof on 8 August 1944, he was sentenced to death and hanged later the same day at Plötzensee Prison in Berlin.

Awards
 German Cross in Silver on 30 December 1943 as Generalleutnant and commander of Berlin

Literature
 Roland Kopp, Paul von Hase. Von der Alexander-Kaserne nach Plötzensee. Eine deutsche Soldatenbiographie 1885–1944; Münster – Hamburg – London (LIT) 2001
 Heinrich Bücheler, Paul von Hase. Der Wehrmachtkommandant von Groß-Berlin 1940–1944; in: Damals 7 (Juli 1984), 611 ff.

See also
 List of members of the 20 July plot
 Widerstand

References

Bibliography

External links

 

1885 births
1944 deaths
Lieutenant generals of the German Army (Wehrmacht)
Military personnel from Hanover
People from the Province of Hanover
People executed by hanging at Plötzensee Prison
People from Lower Saxony executed at Plötzensee Prison
Executed members of the 20 July plot
German Army personnel of World War I
Prussian Army personnel
Recipients of the clasp to the Iron Cross, 1st class
Reichswehr personnel
Executed military leaders